The British Columbia Bears (formerly Pacific Tyee) are the senior men's representative rugby team for British Columbia. They were founded in 2009 to compete in the Americas Rugby Championship against other representative teams from Canada, Argentina, and the United States. In their inaugural season, the Bears went undefeated in round robin play against other Canadian teams and only fell to the Argentina Jaguars in the ARC Final.

Beginning in 2010 the team, along with the Ontario Blues, The Rock, and the Prairie Wolf Pack, have participated in the newly formed Canadian Rugby Championship. This offshoot of the Americas Rugby Championship sees these teams once again compete in a round robin schedule.

Home grounds
The Bears do not have a permanent home ground but play at various fields around British Columbia. In their inaugural year the team hosted matches at Brockton Oval in Vancouver and MacDonald Park in Victoria as well as at Westhills Stadium (then known as Bear Mountain Stadium) in Langford. The 2010 season saw the Bears play exclusively at Klahanie Park in West Vancouver. 2011 saw the team again play a majority of their home games at Klahanie with the exception of one match being played at the Apple Bowl in Kelowna. For the 2013 season, the Bears played exclusively at Westhills Stadium.

Season records

Americas Rugby Championship

Canadian Rugby Championship

Best in the West

Honours

 Canadian Rugby Championship
 Champions: 2 (2009, 2017)
 Americas Rugby Championship
 Champions: 0
 Runners-up: 1 (2009)

Current squad

Squad for the 2018 Canadian Rugby Championship season

Props
 Noah Barker
 John Braddock
 Nik Hildebrand
 Clint Lemkus
 Liam Murray

Hookers
 Paul Ahn
 Steven Ng
 Blake van Heyningen

Locks
 Mike Finnemore
 Craig McLaughlin
 Shea Wakefield
 Cam Polson

Loose forwards
 Dustin Dobravsky
 Luke Campbell
 Jason Hignell
 Travis Larsen
 Connor McCann
 Oliver Nott
 Nathan Stewart

Half backs
 James Pitblado
 Jorden Sandover-Best

Fly halves
 Theo Sauder
 Giuseppe du Toit

Centres
 Doug Fraser
 Mike Nieuwenhuysen
 Josh Thiel

Wings
 Jared Douglas
 Fraser Hurst
 Isaac Kaay
 Clayton Meeres

Full backs
 Sean Ferguson
 Aaron McLelland

Notable players

Canada

The following players have represented Canada at full international level.

Ryan Ackerman
Noah Barker
George Barton
Connor Braid
Mike Burak
Luke Campbell
Admir Cejvanovic
Liam Chisholm
Luke Cudmore
Thyssen de Goede
Dustin Dobravsky
Joe Dolesau
Sean Duke
Giuseppe du Toit
Brian Erichsen
Ed Fairhurst
Aaron Flagg
Doug Fraser
Mike Fuailefau
Mitch Gudgeon
Ryan Hamilton
Brodie Henderson
Nathan Hirayama
Jake Ilnicki
Harry Jones
Adam Kleeberger
Anthony Luca
Phil Mack
Jason Marshall
Callum Morrison
Oliver Nott
Cameron Pierce
Pat Riordan
Jorden Sandover-Best
Theo Sauder
David Spicer
Brock Staller
Josh Thiel
Conor Trainor
Sean White
Eric Wilson

Overseas Representatives

The following players have achieved representative honours at an international level.

 Andrey Proshin

Games played against international opposition

Head coaching history

References

External links
 British Columbia Rugby Union website
 CRC Official Website 

 
Rugby clubs established in 2009
2009 establishments in British Columbia
Canadian Rugby Championship